Anthony E. Gonzalez (born September 18, 1984) is an American politician and a former American football wide receiver.

He played college football at Ohio State University, where he studied philosophy. He was drafted by the Indianapolis Colts with the final pick in the first round of the 2007 NFL Draft. Following his sports career, which was cut short by injuries, he enrolled in graduate studies at Stanford University and earned a master's degree.

Gonzalez was elected to the U.S. House of Representatives on November 6, 2018, sworn in on January 3, 2019, and reelected in 2020. In September 2021, Gonzalez announced he would not seek another term.

Early years
Gonzalez's maternal grandfather was a World War II veteran. His Cuban-American father immigrated to the U.S. from Cuba after Fidel Castro took power. His father is president of Ferragon Corporation, a steel company.

Gonzalez attended St. Joseph grade school in Avon Lake, Ohio, and Saint Ignatius High School in Cleveland, Ohio, where he was a standout in both football and track. In football, he was a two-way player. As a senior, he was a first-team All-state honoree as well as the Associated Press and The Plain Dealer Co-defensive Player of the Year, catching 71 passes for 1,873 yards and scoring 21 touchdowns. His 26.4 yards per catch set a school record. In track, he lettered for four years and qualified for the state finals as a junior and senior. Gonzalez also played basketball as a freshman. He attended Ohio State University and was an Academic All-American majoring in philosophy, in which he earned a bachelor's degree.

Football career

Collegiate
Gonzalez was a three-year letterman at Ohio State University, playing with fellow future NFL wide receivers Santonio Holmes, Ted Ginn Jr., and Roy Hall, as well as Heisman Trophy-winning quarterback Troy Smith. As a junior, Gonzalez was an All-Big Ten choice by league coaches. He finished his college career playing in the 2007 BCS National Championship Game, where the Buckeyes lost to the Florida Gators 41–14.

Professional

2007 NFL Combine

Indianapolis Colts
Gonzalez was selected by the Indianapolis Colts with the 32nd selection in the 2007 NFL Draft, and was taken to become the Colts' slot receiver. He was one of three Ohio State receivers selected in that draft.

In Gonzalez's first year, he caught 37 passes for 576 yards and three touchdowns. The next season he caught 57 passes for 664 yards and four touchdowns.

In 2009, Gonzalez earned the starting wide receiver position along with Reggie Wayne after Marvin Harrison was released from the team in the off-season. He injured his right knee during the season opener against Jacksonville Jaguars and was expected to miss up to eight weeks. He failed to return that season and was placed on injured reserve on December 24.

In 2010, Gonzalez lost the starting wide receiver position due to missing the 2009 season. He played in a total of two games as a slot receiver with five catches for 67 yards and no touchdowns. He injured his left leg in week eight against the Houston Texans and was placed on Injured Reserve for the rest of the year.

Gonzalez's role in the Colts offense diminished even further during the 2011 season. He played in only eight games and did not catch a pass. He became an unrestricted free agent in the following off-season.

During Gonzalez's time with Indianapolis, the Colts won three AFC South Division titles (2007, 2009, 2010), an AFC Championship (2009), and a trip to Super Bowl XLIV.

New England Patriots
On March 17, 2012, Gonzalez signed with the New England Patriots. The Patriots released him on May 29, 2012.

Career statistics

Regular season

Playoffs

Retirement
Gonzalez decided to retire from sports and enrolled in the Stanford Graduate School of Business in September 2012, from which he received a master of business administration degree.

U.S. House of Representatives

Elections

2018 

In 2018, Gonzalez filed to run as a Republican for the United States House of Representatives in Ohio's 16th congressional district. His predecessor, Jim Renacci, was retiring to mount an unsuccessful Senate campaign against incumbent Sherrod Brown. Gonzalez won the November 6 election with 57% of the vote, becoming the first Latino to represent Ohio in Congress. He raised more than $525,000 in less than a month after announcing his run, including donations from former NFL teammate Peyton Manning, Cleveland Browns owner Jimmy Haslam, and several other former NFL and college football players. Along with Texas Democrat Colin Allred, he was one of two former NFL players to be elected to Congress in 2018.

2020 

Gonzalez defeated the Democratic nominee, physicist Aaron Paul Godfrey, 63.2% to 36.8%.

2022 

Gonzalez originally ran for reelection in the 16th district, prompting a primary challenge from Republicans who supported former President Donald Trump due to Gonzalez's impeachment vote. Ohio's slow population growth in the 2020 United States census made the district obsolete as of 2023, leaving the campaigns' statuses unclear. On September 16, Gonzalez announced he would not run for Congress in 2022.

Tenure 

The House of Representatives impeached President Donald Trump on December 18, 2019, claiming Trump had abused the power of his office and obstructed the will of Congress by seeking foreign aid to influence the results of the 2020 election against challenger Joe Biden. Gonzalez voted not to impeach Trump, saying there was not enough evidence.
  
The Senate voted mostly on party lines to acquit Trump of the charges on February 5, 2020.

Just 12 days before the end of Trump's term, the House passed a second impeachment resolution with one article claiming "incitement of insurrection", before and during the U.S. Capitol attack. Gonzalez was one of ten Republicans who voted to impeach Trump for this offense. The Senate again acquitted Trump.

Ohio Republican Party chair Bob Paduchik said the second impeachment resolution addressed "an unconstitutional, politically motivated process that served no purpose." As a result of his vote to impeach Trump, the Ohio Republican Central Committee voted to censure Gonzalez, stating that Gonzalez had "betrayed his constituents" and "relied on emotions rather than the will of his constituents and any credible facts". Gonzalez and his family received continual threats following the impeachment vote, and he took additional security measures to protect his wife and family.

On May 19, 2021, Gonzalez was one of 35 Republicans who joined all Democrats in voting to approve legislation to establish the January 6 commission meant to investigate the storming of the U.S. Capitol. In retaliation, Trump endorsed former White House aide Max Miller in the 2022 primary for the seat.

On October 21, 2021, Gonzalez was one of nine House Republicans who voted to hold Steve Bannon in contempt of Congress. On November 5, 2021, he was among the 13 House Republicans to break with their party and vote with a majority of Democrats in favor of the Infrastructure Investment and Jobs Act.

Immigration 
Gonzalez voted for the Consolidated Appropriations Act (H.R. 1158) which effectively prohibits ICE from cooperating with Health and Human Services to detain or remove illegal alien sponsors of unaccompanied alien children (UACs).

Same-sex marriage 
On July 19, 2022, Gonzalez was one of 47 Republican Representatives to vote for the Respect for Marriage Act, which would codify the right to same-sex marriage in federal law.

Contraception

Gonzalez voted for H.R. 8373 ("The Right to Contraception Act"), a bill designed to protect access to contraceptives and health care providers' ability to provide contraceptives and information about contraception. It would also fund Planned Parenthood.

Big Tech 
In 2022, Gonzalez was one of 39 Republicans to vote for the Merger Filing Fee Modernization Act of 2022, an antitrust package that would crack down on corporations for anti-competitive behavior.

Committee assignments 
 Committee on Financial Services
 Subcommittee on Housing, Community Development and Insurance
 Subcommittee on National Security, International Development and Monetary Policy
 Subcommittee on Diversity and Inclusion
 Committee on Science, Space and Technology
 Subcommittee on Environment
 Subcommittee on Research and Technology
 United States House Select Committee on the Climate Crisis

Caucus memberships 
 Republican Main Street Partnership
Problem Solvers Caucus

Electoral history

Personal life
Gonzalez, his wife, Elizabeth, and their two children live in Rocky River, Ohio.

See also
List of Hispanic and Latino Americans in the United States Congress

References

External links
 Congressman Anthony Gonzalez official U.S. House website
 
Indianapolis Colts bio

|-

1984 births
21st-century American politicians
American athlete-politicians
American football wide receivers
American politicians of Cuban descent
American sportspeople of Cuban descent
Hispanic and Latino American members of the United States Congress
Indianapolis Colts players
Living people
New England Patriots players
Ohio State Buckeyes football players
People from Avon Lake, Ohio
People from Westlake, Ohio
Players of American football from Cleveland
Republican Party members of the United States House of Representatives from Ohio
Saint Ignatius High School (Cleveland) alumni
Stanford University alumni